Pachypanchax omalonotus, the powder-blue panchax, is a species of Aplocheilid killifish endemic to Madagascar where it is found on the island of Nosy Be and in the Sambirano River basin and adjacent streams on the mainland.  Its natural habitat is rivers.

References

 Loiselle, P. 2006. A review of the Malagasy Pachypanchax (Teleostei: Cyprinodontiformes, Aplocheilidae), with descriptions of four new species. Zootaxa 1366: 1–44 (2006)
 

omalonotus
Freshwater fish of Madagascar
Taxonomy articles created by Polbot
Fish described in 1861
Taxa named by Auguste Duméril
Taxobox binomials not recognized by IUCN